PEM or Pem may refer to:

People
 Pem Sluijter (1939–2007), Dutch poet

Science
 Photoelastic modulator
 Polyelectrolyte multilayer
 Positron emission mammography
 Proton exchange membrane, semipermeable

Engineering
Plastic encapsulated microcircuits, a method for packaging microcircuits
Power entry module 
PEM nut or self-clinching nut

Computing
 PCI Express Mini, a computer bus standard
 Privacy-Enhanced Mail, whose file format is also often used for X.509 certificates

Medicine
 Polioencephalomalacia
 Protein-energy malnutrition
 Pediatric emergency medicine
 Post-exertional malaise

Other
 Parallel Economic Model, a theoretical dual economy model
 Peabody Essex Museum, an art and historical museum located in Salem, Massachusetts, US
 Padre Aldamiz International Airport, Madre de Dios, Peru, IATA code
 Pemberton railway station, England; National Rail station code
 Pembrokeshire, county in Wales, Chapman code
 Private electronic market

See also